Roshtkhar (also Romanized as Rashtkhvār, Roshtkhvār, Roshtehkhvār, and Roshtkhār; also known as Rash Khar, Rashkhvān, Roshkhvār, and Rūshkār) is a city and capital of Roshtkhar County, in Razavi Khorasan Province, Iran. At the 2006 census, its population was 5,123, in 1,278 families.

References 

Cities in Razavi Khorasan Province
Populated places in Roshtkhar County